Juan Pablo Rodríguez Barragán (born December 22, 1956) is a Colombian Army General. He served as the Commander General of the  Colombian Armed Forces. He was also the Chief Army General, and prior to that he served as the commander of the 5th Army Division.

References

Colombian generals
People from Cundinamarca Department
1956 births
Living people